The 1955 Big Ten Conference Men's Golf Championship was held on May 27–28, 1955 at the Purdue Golf Course (South) in Lafayette, Indiana. The team champion was Purdue with a score of 1,141 and the individual champion was Roger Rubendall of Wisconsin who shot a 216.

Team results

Individual results
The championship was shortened for the first time ever from 72 holes to 54 as a result of storms canceling a morning round on Saturday.

Purdue

Ohio State

Wisconsin

Michigan

Minnesota

Iowa

Michigan State

Illinois
Scores don't add up to 1,205.

Northwestern

Indiana

The top five player scores counted towards the championship.

Round summaries
The 1955 Big Ten Championship was played over two days with two 18-hole rounds played on the first day and an 18-hole round played on the final day, for a total of 54 holes.

First round
Friday, May 27, 1955

Second round
Friday, May 27, 1955

Final round 
Saturday, May 28, 1955

References

Big Ten Conference men's golf
Big Ten Conference Men's Golf Championship